Live at the BJCC Arena is a live DVD by the band Widespread Panic.  The album and accompanying film were recorded in Birmingham, Alabama on April 15, 2011.

Track listing

Disc One 
 Pigeons
 North
 Hatfield
 Riders On The Storm
 Bust It Big
 Walk On The Flood
 Saint Ex
 Blackout Blues
 Feelin' Alright

Disc Two
 Little Kin
 Strange Times
 Proving Ground
 Big Wooly Mammoth
 Drums
 Mercy
 Proving Ground
 Blight
 Driving Song
 Disco
 Driving Song
 Holden Oversoul
 Expiration Day
 Wondering
 Porch

Personnel 
John Bell
John "JoJo" Hermann
Jimmy Herring
Todd Nance
Domingo S. Ortiz
Dave Schools

Widespread Panic video albums
2011 live albums
2011 video albums
Live video albums